
Hepatocyte nuclear factor 4 gamma (HNF4G) also known as NR2A2 (nuclear receptor subfamily 2, group A, member 2) is a nuclear receptor that in humans is encoded by the HNF4G gene.

See also 
Hepatocyte nuclear factor 4
Hepatocyte nuclear factors

References

Further reading

External links 
 

Intracellular receptors
Transcription factors